The Canada women's national artistic gymnastics team represents Canada in FIG international competitions.

History
Canada has participated in the Olympic Games women's team competition 10 times, finishing as high as fifth place. The team has also made 25 appearances at the World Artistic Gymnastics Championships, winning their first team medal, a bronze, in 2022.

Current roster

Team competition results

Olympic Games
 1928 — did not participate
 1936 — did not participate
 1948 — did not participate
 1952 — did not participate
 1956 — did not participate
 1960 — did not participate
 1964 — did not participate
 1968 — 11th place
Suzanne Cloutier, Jennifer Diachun, Sandra Hartley, Teresa McDonnell, Marilynn Minaker
 1972 — 11th place
Lise Arsenault, Susan Buchanan, Jennifer Diachun, Nancy McDonnell, Teresa McDonnell, Sharon Tsukamoto
 1976 — 9th place
Lise Arsenault, Karen Kelsall, Nancy McDonnell, Teresa McDonnell, Kelly Muncey, Patti Rope
 1980 — did not participate
 1984 — 5th place
Anita Botnen, Kelly Brown, Andrea Thomas, Jessica Tudos, Bonnie Wittmeier, Gigi Zosa
 1988 — 11th place
Monica Covacci, Cathy Giancaspro, Larissa Lowing, Christina McDonald, Janine Rankin, Lori Strong
 1992 — 10th place
Mylène Fleury, Janet Morin, Janine Rankin, Lori Strong, Stella Umeh, Jennifer Wood
 1996 — did not participate
 2000 — 9th place
Julie Beaulieu, Michelle Conway, Crystal Gilmore, Lise Leveille, Kate Richardson, Yvonne Tousek
 2004 — 10th place
Melanie Banville, Gael Mackie, Amelie Plante, Heather Purnell, Kate Richardson, Kylie Stone
 2008 — did not participate
 2012 — 5th place
Ellie Black, Victoria Moors, Dominique Pegg, Brittany Rogers, Kristina Vaculik
 2016 — 9th place
Ellie Black, Shallon Olsen, Isabela Onyshko, Brittany Rogers, Rose-Kaying Woo
 2020 — 10th place
Ellie Black, Brooklyn Moors, Shallon Olsen, Ava Stewart

World Championships

 1934 — did not participate
 1938 — did not participate
 1950 — did not participate
 1954 — did not participate
 1958 — did not participate
 1962 — 16th place
Gail Daley, Bonnie Dertell, Irene Haworth, Leissa Krol, Maureen McDonald, Lynne Wozniak
 1966 — 15th place
Elsbeth Austin, Leslie Bird, Suzanne Cloutier, Sandra Hartley, Irene Haworth, Marilynn Minaker
 1970 — 13th place
Lise Arsenault, Susan Buchanan, Jennifer Diachun, Sandra Hartley, Nancy McDonnell, Teresa McDonnell
 1974 — 11th place
Lise Arsenault, Jennifer Diachun, Nancy McDonnell, Teresa McDonnell, Patti Rope, Sharon Tsukamoto
 1978 — 8th place
Monica Goermann, Sherry Hawco, Karen Kelsall, Elfi Schlegel
 1979 — 10th place
Carmen Alie, Diane Carnegie, Shannon Fleming, Monica Goermann, Elfi Schlegel, Ellen Stewart
 1981 — 10th place
Sara Aggiss, Anita Botnen, Anne Marie Deserres, Leanne Gallant, Elfi Schlegel, Bonnie Wittmeier
 1983 — 10th place
Anita Botnen, Leanne Gallant, Janice Kerr, Elfi Schlegel, Andrea Thomas, Bonnie Wittmeier
 1985 — 9th place
Sandra Botnen, Cathy Giancaspro, Sasha Ivanochko, Christina McDonald, Andrea Owoc, Andrea Thomas
 1987 — 8th place
Monica Covacci, Cathy Giancaspro, Larissa Lowing, Christina McDonald, Janine Rankin, Lori Strong
 1989 — 6th place
Monica Covacci, Leah Homma, Kerri Kanuka, Larissa Lowing, Lori Strong
 1991 — 12th place
Janet Morin, Koyuki Oka, Sarah Rainey, Janine Rankin, Lori Strong, Stella Umeh
 1994 — 10th place
Marilou Cousineau, Lena Degteva, Jennifer Exaltacion, Jaime Hill, Eve-Marie Poulin, Lisa Simes, Theresa Wolf
 1995 — 15th place
Stephanie Cappuccitti, Marilou Cousineau, Lena Degteva, Jennifer Exaltacion, Shanyn MacEachern, Yvonne Tousek, Theresa Wolf
 1997 — 8th place
Sarah Deegan, Veronique Leclerc, Shanyn MacEachern, Katie McAvoy, Katie Rowland, Yvonne Tousek
 1999 — 10th place
Julie Beaulieu, Michelle Conway, Emilie Fournier, Lise Leveille, Kate Richardson, Yvonne Tousek
 2001 — 10th place
Crystal Gilmore, Joelle Ouellette, Ashley Peckett, Amelie Plante, Kate Richardson, Jennifer Simbhudas
 2003 — 11th place
Melanie Banville, Amelie Plante, Heather Purnell, Richelle Simpson, Kylie Stone, Lydia Williams
 2006 — 14th place
Marci Bernholtz, Alyssa Brown, Crystal Gilmore, Brittnee Habbib, Elyse Hopfner-Hibbs, Rebecca Simbhudas
 2007 — 14th place
Marci Bernholtz, Alyssa Brown, Nansy Damianova, Elyse Hopfner-Hibbs, Sydney Sawa, Kristina Vaculik
 2010 — 13th place
Bianca Dancose-Giambattisto, Coralie Leblond-Chartrand, Charlotte Mackie, Dominique Pegg, Jessica Savona, Kristina Vaculik
 2011 — 11th place
Talia Chiarelli, Madeline Gardiner, Mikaela Gerber, Coralie Leblond-Chartrand, Christine 'Peng Peng' Lee, Dominique Pegg
 2014 — 12th place
Ellie Black, Maegan Chant, Isabela Onyshko, Kirsten Peterman, Victoria-Kayen Woo, Aleeza Yu
 2015 — 6th place
Ellie Black, Isabela Onyshko, Brittany Rogers, Audrey Rousseau, Sydney Townsend, Victoria-Kayen Woo
 2018 — 4th place
Ellie Black, Sophie Marois, Brooklyn Moors, Shallon Olsen, Ana Padurariu
2019 – 7th place
Ellie Black, Brooklyn Moors, Shallon Olsen, Ana Padurariu, Victoria-Kayen Woo
2022 –  bronze medal
Ellie Black, Laurie Denommée, Denelle Pedrick, Emma Spence, Sydney Turner, Shallon Olsen

Most decorated gymnasts
This list includes all Canadian female artistic gymnasts who have won a medal at the Olympic Games or the World Artistic Gymnastics Championships.

See also 
 List of Olympic female artistic gymnasts for Canada
 Canada men's national artistic gymnastics team

References

Gymnastics in Canada
National women's artistic gymnastics teams
Women's national sports teams of Canada